Nagahira Okabe (10 August 1913 – 2001) was a Japanese equestrian. He competed in two events at the 1964 Summer Olympics.

References

External links

1913 births
2001 deaths
Japanese male equestrians
Japanese dressage riders
Olympic equestrians of Japan
Equestrians at the 1964 Summer Olympics
Place of birth missing